David R. Young (born November 10, 1936) is an American lawyer, businessman, and academic. He served as a Special Assistant at the National Security Council in the Nixon administration and an Administrative Assistant to Henry Kissinger. He has lived in the United Kingdom since the mid-1970s.

Early life, education, family, and early career
Young was born in Jersey City, New Jersey. He received degrees from Wheaton College, Illinois, and Queen's College, Oxford, as well as a law degree from the Law School at Cornell University, New York. In 1965, he was employed with law offices of Millbank, Tweed, Hadley and McCloy, New York.

He is married to Suzy, and they have five children: Bradden, Catherine, Christina, Davy, and Cameron.

Joins Nixon White House
Young began his work for the Nixon administration in 1970 when he was appointed Special Assistant to the National Security Council. In 1971, Young worked with Egil Krogh, deputy to John D. Ehrlichman. This assignment was concerned with domestic and external security.

In this role, Young investigated information leaks within the Nixon administration, ultimately being jointly responsible with Egil Krogh for the founding of the White House Special Investigations Unit, subsequently known as "The Plumbers" ("We stop leaks"). It is said that Young's grandfather was a plumber and that this was his inspiration for the name.

Watergate involvement
E. Howard Hunt and G. Gordon Liddy, of the Plumbers unit, participated in clandestine (later established to be illegal) activities, the most notorious being the attempted 1971 burglary of the offices of Daniel Ellsberg's former psychiatrist and the attempted 1972 burglary of the Democratic National Committee offices at the Watergate complex.

During the investigation of these attempted burglaries, Young was granted limited immunity on the motion of the Senate Select Committee on Presidential Campaign Activities (the "Senate Watergate Investigation Committee") and the approval of United States District Judge John J. Sirica, on July 5, 1973.

Move to England
Young subsequently returned to Queen's College, Oxford, where he completed a doctorate. He founded Oxford Analytica, a politics and economics consulting firm, from which he retired in 2015. The basis of the format for its briefings was the "Presidential Daily Brief" which he helped Henry Kissinger prepare for Nixon.

Since 1975, Young has also served as Lecturer in Politics at Queen's College, University of Oxford. He is a Senior Associate Member of St Antony's College, a Dominus Fellow of St Catherine's College, and Senior Common Room Member of University College. He has served as an Associate Member of the Royal Institute of International Affairs and the International Institute of Strategic Studies since 1980.

References

1936 births
Academics of the University of Oxford
Alumni of The Queen's College, Oxford
American expatriate academics
Cornell Law School alumni
Living people
Wheaton College (Illinois) alumni
Nixon administration personnel involved in the Watergate scandal
New York (state) Republicans